Gloucester House is a building at 137 Piccadilly, London, on the corner of Old Park Lane.

The first house was built early in the reign of George III (reigned 1760–1820), and was where Thomas Bruce, 7th Earl of Elgin briefly exhibited the Parthenon Marbles before selling them to the Crown, who now hold them in the British Museum. It was occupied by Prince William Frederick, Duke of Gloucester and Edinburgh from 1816 until his death in 1834, after which it was occupied by Prince George, Duke of Cambridge.

The house was demolished in 1904 following the Duke of Cambridge's death. It was rebuilt as apartments. The first Hard Rock Cafe opened here in 1971.

References
Citations

Sources

 

18th-century establishments in England
Houses completed in the 18th century
Buildings and structures in Mayfair
Thomas Bruce, 7th Earl of Elgin
Parthenon
Houses in the City of Westminster
Buildings and structures on Piccadilly